Spring Awakening may refer to:

Spring Awakening (play), an 1891 play by Frank Wedekind
Spring Awakening (1924 film), an Austrian silent drama film based on the play
Spring Awakening (1929 film), a silent film based on the play
Spring Awakening (musical), a 2006 musical by Steven Sater and Duncan Sheik based on the Wedekind play
Operation Spring Awakening (German: Frühlingserwachen), Nazi Germany's last World War II offensive
Spring Awakening (festival), an annual musical festival held in Chicago.